The Copa do Brasil 1993 was the 5th staging of the Copa do Brasil.

The competition started on March 2, 1993, and concluded on June 3, 1993, with the second leg of the final, held at the Mineirão Stadium in Belo Horizonte, in which Cruzeiro lifted the trophy for the first time with a 2-1 victory over Grêmio.

Gílson, of Grêmio, with 8 goals, was the competition's topscorer.

Format
The competition was disputed by 32 clubs in a knock-out format where all rounds were played over two legs and the away goals rule was used.

Competition stages

References
 Copa do Brasil 1993 at RSSSF
 Copa do Brasil top scorers at Campeões do Futebol
Enciclopédia do Futebol Brasileiro, Volume 2 - Lance, Rio de Janeiro: Aretê Editorial S/A, 2001.

1993
1993 in Brazilian football
1993 domestic association football cups